The chapters of the Japanese manga series Shaman King were written and illustrated by Hiroyuki Takei. They were serialized in Shueisha's Weekly Shōnen Jump from 1998 to 2004. The series follows the story of Yoh Asakura, a shaman who enters into a worldwide tournament of shamans in which the winner would become the savior of the world.

The 285 chapters, identified as "Reincarnations," were collected into 32 tankōbon volumes by Shueisha. The first volume was published on December 3, 1998, and volume 32 on January 5, 2005. The first 31 volumes were published once the serialization ended, but the publishing of volume 32 (meant to be published on December 3, 2004) was delayed as Shueisha reported they would only publish it if they receive evidence of demand from approximately 50,000 people.

During Jump Festa 2008, Shueisha announced a kanzenban reprint of the entire series. The series is called Shaman King Kanzen-Ban, or Perfect Edition. This release reprinted the entire series in 27 volumes, complete with new, clear image overlays on the covers, and concluding with an alternative ending. Without the original chapter 285, the kanzenban has sixteen additional chapters and 300 chapters in total. The first volume was published on March 3, 2008, and volume 27 was published on April 3, 2009.

Shaman King was previously licensed in North America by Viz Media for an English-language adaptation, with some chapters initially serialized in its Shonen Jump magazine. The series first appeared in Shonen Jumps third issue from 2003, and last in its September 2007 issue. Viz Media published the original 32 Shaman King volumes: the first was published on September 3, 2003, and the last on January 4, 2011. On July 21, 2020, Kodansha USA announced that they held the rights to Shaman King in English, and they will released all 35 volumes via Comixology and Amazon Kindle Store in July of that year, however it was delayed to October 6 of the same year. Kodansha USA also announced that they will release the series physically in twelve three-in-one omnibus editions. The first volume was published on March 23, 2021, while the last was released on March 7, 2023.

Volume list

Chapters collected exclusively in kanzenban format
The following chapters are featured only in the kanzenban series volumes, which do not contain the original chapter 285. The additional chapters 265 and 266 are collected in volume 24, renumbering all subsequent chapters of the series. Chapters 287–291 are in volume 26 and chapters 292–300 in volume 27. Some chapters in the original series were renamed, but otherwise contained the same content.
Reincarnation 265. 
Reincarnation 266. 
Reincarnation 287. 
Reincarnation 288. 
Reincarnation 289. 
Reincarnation 290. 
Reincarnation 291. 
Reincarnation 292. 
Reincarnation 293. 
Reincarnation 294. "Last Test: Shaman Fight"
Reincarnation 295. 
Reincarnation 296. 
Reincarnation 297. 
Reincarnation 298. 
Reincarnation 299. 
Reincarnation 300. "The Last Word"

References

External links
Official Shaman King website 
Official website from Shonen Jump

Chapters
Shaman King